Landsteiner is a tiny, bowl-shaped lunar impact crater located in the central Mare Imbrium. It was named after Austrian-American pathologist and Nobel laureate Karl Landsteiner. It is a circular, cup-shaped feature with no appreciable erosion. Nearby to the south is a low wrinkle ridge named the Dorsum Grabau. Farther south is the prominent crater Timocharis.

This feature was identified as Timocharis F prior to being renamed by the IAU.

References

External links

 LTO-40B2 Landsteiner — L&PI topographic map

Impact craters on the Moon
Mare Imbrium